Chadlia Saïda Farhat Essebsi (1 August 1936 – 15 September 2019) was the First Lady of Tunisia (2014–2019) as the wife of President Beji Caid Essebsi. She was Tunisia's fifth first lady, as well as the second following the Tunisian Revolution.

Biography 
Farhat was born on 1 August 1936. She married Beji Caid Essebsi, a lawyer and politician ten years her senior, on 8 February 1958. The couple had four children: two daughters, Amel and Salwa, and two sons, Mohamed Hafedh and Khélil.

Farhat Essebsi became First Lady of Tunisia on 31 December 2014 upon the inauguration of her husband as president. She reportedly disliked the idea of moving to Carthage Palace, the official Presidential Palace, as it was at a distance from her family. As first lady, she assumed a higher profile, both in public and behind-the-scenes, than her immediate predecessor, first lady .

Death
Farhat Essebsi died of a heart attack on 15 September 2019, aged 83, less than two months after her husband and on the same day as a national election to determine President Essebsi's permanent successor.

References

External links

1936 births
2019 deaths
Tunisian Muslims
First Ladies of Tunisia
People from Tunis
20th-century Tunisian women
21st-century Tunisian women